Gemma Lawley (born 15 September 2002) is an English defender who plays for FA Women's Championship team Birmingham City.

Club career 
Lawley joined the Birmingham City academy at the age of 16 having previously been part of the West Bromwich Albion youth setup. She made her senior debut for Birmingham on 30 September 2020, starting against Everton in a 4–0 FA Cup semi-final defeat to Everton which had been delayed from the previous season due to the COVID-19 pandemic. Her first FA WSL appearance came against West Ham United on 8 November 2020, appearing as a substitute for the last three minutes of the match as Birmingham lost 2–1.  Lawley finished her first full campaign with a combined ten appearances as Birmingham finished 11th out of 12. In July 2021, Lawley signed a two-year contract ahead of the 2021–22 season.

Lawley's involvement with the first team increased significantly in her second season, with 19 league appearances including 18 starts and a further six cup appeaances. She scored her first professional goal in a 3–2 loss to Reading on 23 January 2022. The goal came in the third minute of the game, a header from Lucy Quinn's corner. On 4 May 2022, Birmingham City were relegated to the FA Women's Championship following a 6–0 defeat away at Manchester City with one game remaining.

International career 
In November 2020, Lawley was called up to the England under-19s.

Career statistics

Club 
.

References 

English women's footballers
Women's association football central defenders
Birmingham City W.F.C. players
Women's Super League players
2002 births
Living people